is a Japanese football player for Thespakusatsu Gunma.

Career
After being a protagonist with Aomori Yamada High School, Nakamura joined Montedio Yamagata for 2018 season.

Club statistics
Updated to 23 August 2018.

References

External links
 Shunta Nakamura at J.LEAGUE Data Site (archived) 
 Shunta Nakamura at J.LEAGUE.jp 
 Shunta Nakamura at Montedio Yamagata (archived) 
 

1999 births
Living people
Association football people from Chiba Prefecture
Japanese footballers
J2 League players
Montedio Yamagata players
Thespakusatsu Gunma players
Association football midfielders